Tušická Nová Ves is a village and municipality in Michalovce District in the Kosice Region of eastern Slovakia.

History
In historical records the village was first mentioned in 1342.

Geography
The village lies at an altitude of 108 metres and covers an area of 4.328 km². The municipality has a population of about 585 people.

See also
 List of municipalities and towns in Michalovce District
 List of municipalities and towns in Slovakia

External links
http://www.statistics.sk/mosmis/eng/run.html

Villages and municipalities in Michalovce District